Kake City School District (KCSD) is a school district headquartered in Kake, Alaska.

It operates one school and the Shirly Jackson Community Library.

References

External links
 

School districts in Alaska
Education in Unorganized Borough, Alaska
Prince of Wales–Hyder Census Area, Alaska